Orchestral Favorites is an album by Frank Zappa first released in May 1979 on his own DiscReet Records label.  The album is entirely instrumental and features music performed by the 37-piece Abnuceals Emuukha Electric Symphony Orchestra. It reached #168 on the Billboard 200 album chart in the United States.

Recording sessions
The recordings were sourced from performances recorded September 17–19, 1975 at Royce Hall on the UCLA campus with conductor Michael Zearott. There were two nights of live concert performances and an additional day of recording sessions without the audience.

Strictly Genteel was heard earlier as part of the 200 Motels film and soundtrack album in 1971. Bogus Pomp is also made up of themes that were used in 200 Motels. The album contains a new arrangement of  Duke of Prunes, originally on the 1967 album Absolutely Free. There are no overdubs on the album other than Zappa's electric guitar solo, which he later added to this track. According to Zappa, he funded the entire production cost of about $200,000 from his own pocket.

History
An early version of the album titled Six Things was cut as a demo acetate disc at Kendun Recorders in Burbank, California in April 1976. This was a different edit which included Re-Gyptian Strut and Music For Guitar & Low Budget Orch, which were later cut from the album. The same year Zappa negotiated a distribution deal for an orchestral album with Columbia Masterworks, but the deal fell through when Columbia did not agree to Zappa's terms. Zappa also played a demo disc of an unreleased orchestral album in 1976, according to biographer Barry Miles.

In May 1976 Zappa's relationship with manager and business partner Herb Cohen ended in litigation. Zappa and Cohen's company DiscReet Records was distributed by Warner Bros. Records. At this point Zappa was still contracted to deliver four more albums to Warner for release on Discreet.

In March 1977 Zappa delivered master tapes for all four albums to Warner to fulfill this contract. Zappa did not receive payment from Warner upon delivery of the tapes, which was a contract violation. In a 1978 radio interview Zappa listed the four albums delivered to Warner and called this album by the title Zappa Orchestral Favorites.

After a long legal between Zappa and Warner, the Discreet label eventually released four Zappa albums during 1978 and 1979: Zappa In New York, Studio Tan, Sleep Dirt and Orchestral Favorites. (Since Zappa In New York was configured as a two-LP set, the complete four individual album collection actually contains a total of five full-length LPs.)

Much of the material from these four albums was also edited by Zappa into a four-LP box set called Läther. Zappa announced this album in a mid September 1977 interview where he described it as his "current album". Three tracks from Orchestral Favorites also were included in Läther: "Pedro's Dowry", "Naval Aviation in Art?", and "Duke of Prunes" (titled there as "The Duke of Orchestral Prunes".)

Zappa negotiated a distribution deal with Phonogram Inc. to release Läther as the first release on the Zappa Records label. The album was scheduled for a Halloween October 31, 1977 release date. But Warner claimed ownership of the material and threatened legal action, forcing Zappa to shelve the project.

As Zappa had delivered only the tapes to Warner, Orchestral Favorites was released in May 1979 with no musician credits. Warner also commissioned sleeve art by cartoonist Gary Panter, which was not approved by Zappa.

CD editions 
Zappa chose to issue Orchestral Favorites on Compact Disc on his Barking Pumpkin label in 1991 with Panter's original artwork and added credits. This edition has the stereo orientation of the left and right channels switched from the original release. This CD was reissued in 1995 by Rykodisc and at that time Panter provided additional art.

The Läther album was eventually released on CD in 1996 after Zappa's death.

In 2012 Orchestral Favorites was reissued by the Zappa Records label. Despite new packaging the content is the same as previous CD releases. The 40th Anniversary Edition, released in 2019 uses the original stereo orientation as the 1979 LP. This version also contains two discs of previously unreleased bonus material from the 1975 sessions.

Track listing
All tracks written, composed and arranged by Frank Zappa.

40th Anniversary Track Listing

Personnel 
 Frank Zappa – guitar, vocals
 Ian Underwood, Mike Lang & Ralph Grierson – keyboards
 Bill Mays – Clavinet
 Dave Parlato – bass
 Terry Bozzio – drums
 Emil Richards, Alan Estes, John Bergamo & Tom Raney – percussion
 Mike Altschul – flute and clarinet
 Malcolm McNab, Gene Goe & Ray Poper – trumpet
 Bruce Fowler, Jock Ellis & Kenny Shroyer – trombone
 Dana Hughes – bass trombone
 Don Waldrop – tuba & contrabass trombone
 Dave Shostac – flute, tenor sax
 Gary Foster – 2nd flute (and doubles)
 Ray Reed – flute, alto sax
 Vic Morosco – clarinet, alto sax
 Jay Migliori – clarinet, tenor sax
 Mike Altschul – bass clarinet, baritone sax
 Earle Dumler – oboe, English horn, bass oboe
 John Winter – oboe, English horn
 David Scherr – 2nd oboe, tenor sax
 Joann Caldwell – bassoon
 Bobby Tricarico – bassoon, contrabassoon
 David Duke, Arthur Briegleb, Todd Miller & Bob Henderson – French horn
 Tommy Morgan – harmonica (on "Duke Of Prunes")
 John Wittenberg & Bobby Dubow – violin
 Pamela Goldsmith – viola
 Jerry Kessler – cello
 Lou Anne Neill – harp
 Michael Zearott – conductor

Charts
Album – Billboard (United States)

References

1979 albums
Albums produced by Frank Zappa
DiscReet Records albums
Frank Zappa albums
Albums with cover art by Gary Panter
Unauthorized albums